Louise Grinberg (born 1993) is a French actress.

Career
She made her film debut in 2008 in the French drama The Class where she played a schoolgirl. The film won a Golden Palm at Cannes.  After participating in this film, she decided to become an actress. She played the lead role in the 2011 film 17 Girls. The following year she played the daughter of Denis Ménochet in the romantic comedy Je me suis fait tout petit. In 2014, she appeared in the comedy  À toute épreuve, with Thomas Solivéres and Samy Seghir.

Personal life
She is the niece of actress Anouk Grinberg.

Filmography

References

External links
 

French film actresses
1993 births
Living people
Actresses from Paris